The Congress of the State of Jalisco is the legislative branch of  the government of the State of Jalisco. It was constituted for the first time after the independence of Mexico on September 8, 1823. Having its first session on September 14 of the same year. The Congress is the governmental deliberative body of  Jalisco, which is equal to, and independent of, the executive.

At present it is composed of an assembly of 38 deputies, 20 of whom are elected on a first-past-the-post basis, one for each district in which the entity is divided. The rest is elected through a system of proportional representation. Deputies are elected to serve for a three-year term. Its headquarters is the Palace of the Legislative Power of Jalisco, in the Historic Center of Guadalajara. Since its formation, the congress has been renewed 61 times.

In the Congress there are 21 Legislative Commissions in charge of analyzing and commenting on the bills and initiatives that are presented to the vote of the whole chamber. These bodies are made up of deputies. It also has a board of directors that is responsible for the legal representation of the Congress and coordinating the work of the committees.

Organization 

The State Congress works as an assembly and it is assisted in the fulfillment of its duties by:

 Board of Directors
 Legislative Commissions
 Committees
 Administrative and technical bodies

See also
List of Mexican state congresses

References

External links
Congress of Jalisco webpage

Jalisco, Congress of
Government of Jalisco